Erebus sumbana is a moth of the family Erebidae first described by Charles Swinhoe in 1918. It is found on the Indonesian islands of Seram and Sumba and the Philippine island of Luzon.

References

Moths described in 1920
Erebus (moth)